Yellowthread Street is a British television police drama, first broadcast in 1990, that focuses on the work of a group of detectives in the Royal Hong Kong Police. Developed and produced by Ranald Graham, the series was loosely based on the novels by William Leonard Marshall. A single season of thirteen episodes was produced by Yorkshire Television and broadcast on ITV from January 13 to April 7, 1990. The series starred Ray Lonnen as principal character Alex Vale, with Bruce Payne, Robert Taylor, Doreen Chan, Tzi Ma, Mark McGann and Catherine Neilson also appearing as detectives in the series.

The series was well received by viewers and critics alike, despite only lasting one season. However, the series also received negative press, with Matters Criminous stating that "The series chiefest goal seemed to have been to explore just how very badly a dramatisation can corrupt and befoul the ideas and characters of a book." The series was also celebrated for the use of state-of-the-art technology involved with the production, including becoming one of the first series on British television with stereo sound. The series has never been released on D.V.D.

Novels
In the Yellowthread Street novels, the detectives of the Yellowthread Street police station are based in the fictitious Hong Bay, Hong Kong. Four principal characters are featured in the novels; DCI Harry Feiffer, of European heritage but third generation born and brought up in the Colony, Senior Inspector Christopher O'Yee, a half-Chinese American and the ever-bickering team of Inspectors Auden and Spencer, who attempt to find the rational basis for inexplicable and seemingly bizarre crimes.

One of the most notable novels is 1988's Out of Nowhere, in which Feiffer must figure out why in the pre-dawn hours, four people in a plate-glass-filled van with Chinese opera blaring out of the tape deck were driving on the wrong side of a deserted motorway, miles from the nearest on-ramp, before dying in a violent collision with an oncoming lorry. Sixteen novels were published between 1975 and 1998: Yellowthread Street (1975), The Hatchet Man (1976), Gelignite (1976), Thin Air (1977), Skulduggery (1979), Sci-Fi (1981), Perfect End (1981), War Machine (1982), The Far Away Man (1984), Roadshow (1985), Head First (1986), Frogmouth (1987), Out of Nowhere (1988), Inches (1994), Nightmare Syndrome (1997) and To The End (1998).

Cast
 Ray Lonnen as Chief Inspector Alex Vale
 Doreen Chan as Detective Jackie Wu
 Bruce Payne as Detective Nick Eden
 Robert Taylor as Detective Peter Marenta
 Tzi Ma as Detective Eddie Pak
 Mark McGann as Detective CJ Brady
 Catherine Neilson as Detective Kelly Lang

Recurring Cast
 Kenny Chan as Detective Chan 
 Diego Swing as Frankie Ku 
 Ming-Yang Li as Blind Beggar 
 Christopher Leung as Szi Tai
 Winnie Tang as Jei

Production

The series cost approximately £8 million. This made it the most expensive series fully financed by an ITV company at the time of its broadcast.

Episodes

References

External links
 

1990s British drama television series
1990 British television series debuts
1990 British television series endings
British crime television series
ITV television dramas
Television shows based on Australian novels
1990s British television miniseries
Television series by ITV Studios
Television series by Yorkshire Television
English-language television shows
Television shows set in Hong Kong